Dalbec may refer to:

 Aaron Dalbec, American musician
 Bobby Dalbec (born 1995), American baseball player for the Boston Red Sox
 Dalbec (folklore),  a folk hero from Québec folklore